Valeria "Valy" Ionescu (later Constantin, born 31 August 1960) is a retired long jumper from Romania. She won the European title in 1982 and an Olympic silver medal in 1984. Ionescu spent her entire career with the club Rapid Bucuresti, and later worked there as a coach and official.

References

1960 births
Living people
Romanian female long jumpers
People from Turnu Măgurele
Olympic athletes of Romania
Athletes (track and field) at the 1984 Summer Olympics
Olympic silver medalists for Romania
World record setters in athletics (track and field)
European Athletics Championships medalists
Olympic silver medalists in athletics (track and field)
Universiade medalists in athletics (track and field)
Universiade bronze medalists for Romania
Medalists at the 1984 Summer Olympics